Reedley College (Reedley or RC) is a public community college in Reedley, California. It is a part of the California Community Colleges system within the State Center Community College District (SCCCD).  It is accredited by the WASC Accrediting Commission for Community and Junior Colleges. The college offers associate degrees.

History
Reedley College was founded in May 1926, as Reedley Junior College on the campus of Reedley High School. It became a full community college on July 1, 1946. In 1963 the college joined the SCCCD and was renamed Kings River Community College in 1980. However, by popular demand, the name Reedley College was restored in July 1998.

College Centers
Reedley College has two college centers, Madera Community College Center and Oakhurst Community College Center.

It was originally opened at its current site in 1996 and has slowly continued to expand since. Future expansion projects are being planned. The campus currently offers some associate degree majors as well as general education courses transferable to four-year universities. In 2020 the Madera Community College center became a stand alone community college.

The center is housed in four buildings adjacent to the town's library.

Clovis Community College, formerly known as the Willow International Center, was a Reedley College Center until July 1, 2015, when it became a separate campus of the State Center Community College District.

Housing
Reedley College is one of the only community colleges in the state of California to house students on campus. Sequoia Hall houses 40 women and 100 men. Sequoia Hall is located on the southern corner of the campus. One wing is for women and the other wing is for men. Construction of a new Sequoia Hall to replace the original aging facility started during the summer of 2008 and was completed in spring of 2010. The original building was razed.

Athletics
The Reedley College Athletic Department fields teams in 12 intercollegiate sports with five men's teams and seven women's teams. The Tigers are a member of the Central Valley Conference in all sports except for football, which is a member of the Northern California Football Alliance (NCFA). The Reedley College football team won the Northern California Football Championship, the COA State Championship, and finished #1 in the nation in 2002 with a 12–0 record. The women's basketball team has been to the COA Final 16 more than 4 of the last 10 years. The women's tennis team has become a state power with an undefeated conference record since 2007 and various championship titles in recent years. Tiger athletes have gone on to four-year colleges such as Cal, Texas Tech, Fresno State, Oregon, Boise State, Minnesota, Texas State, and Michigan State, to name a few.

Notable alumni
 Josh Allen, NFL quarterback
 Rafael Araujo-Lopes, CFL football player
 Isaac "Ike" Austin, Retired NBA Player originally drafted by the Utah Jazz
 Ervin Baldwin, Retired Chicago Bears and Indianapolis Colts defensive end 
 Dick Cohee, CFL football player
 Bobby Cox, longtime manager of the Atlanta Braves MLB baseball team
 Trey Wolfe, NFL football Player 
 Cliff Hodge, Current Philippine Basketball Association player of the Meralco Bolts
 Anthony W. Ishii, Senior United States district judge of the United States District Court for the Eastern District of California.
 Ed Kezirian, retired college football coach
 Calvin McCarty, CFL football player
 Rolan Milligan, NFL football player
 Darius Reynolds, AFL football player
 Dick Rutan, Aviator who piloted the Voyager aircraft around the world non-stop 
 La Schelle Tarver, Retired MLB baseball player
 Sonny Vaccaro, Former Nike executive known for the Michael Jordan shoe contract and founder of the ABCD Camp
 Danny Villanueva, Retired NFL placekicker and punter. Media Entertainment entrepreneur
 Lutu T. S. Fuimaono, longest-serving member of the American Samoa Senate

Publications
 The Chant (Reedley College newspaper)
 Currents (Reedley College newsletter)
 Symmetry (Reedley College works from English and art students)
 Paper Jam (Reedley College Writing Center newsletter)

References

External links
 Official website

Universities and colleges in Fresno County, California
Educational institutions established in 1926
Schools accredited by the Western Association of Schools and Colleges
California Community Colleges
Forestry education
1926 establishments in California